Van Arsdale is a surname, which may refer to:

Billy Van Arsdale, a fictional character in the novel The Godfather Returns
Corbin Van Arsdale (born 1969),  member of the Texas House of Representatives from Harris County, 2003-2008; since a lawyer and lobbyist in Austin, Texas 
Dick Van Arsdale (born 1943), former professional basketball player and coach
G. E. Van Arsdale, an early aviator
Harry Van Arsdale, Jr. (1905–1986), organized labor leader
John Van Arsdale (born 1756), American Revolutionary War soldier

Mike van Arsdale (born 1965), mixed martial artist
Paul Van Arsdale (born 1920), musician
Thomas Van Arsdale (born 1924), head of the New York City Central Labor Council
Tom Van Arsdale (born 1943), former professional basketball player

See also
Lake Van Arsdale, reservoir in Mendocino County, California

Surnames of Dutch origin